Mulongo is a town in Haut-Lomami, in southern Democratic Republic of the Congo. As of 2012, it has a population of 60,815.

References

Populated places in Haut-Lomami